Megan Sarah Belt (born 6 October 1997) is an English cricketer who currently plays for Kent. She plays as a right-arm off break bowler. She previously played for South East Stars and Oval Invincibles.

Early life
Belt was born on 6 October 1997 in Margate, Kent. She attends Canterbury Christ Church University, as well as working as a PE teacher.

Domestic career
Belt made her county debut in 2013, for Kent against Berkshire. She was part of the Kent team that won the County Championship in 2014, the Twenty20 Cup and County Championship double in 2016 and the County Championship again in 2019.
 She was the leading wicket-taker in the 2013 Women's Twenty20 Cup, and the second-leading wicket-taker in the 2016 County Championship. She also achieved her maiden county five-wicket haul in the 2016 Championship, taking 5/8 against Yorkshire. In 2019, Belt again had a successful season, ending the Championship as Kent's leading wicket-taker, with 12 wickets at an average of 17.75. She was Kent's second-highest wicket-taker in the 2021 Women's Twenty20 Cup, with eight wickets at an average of 16.00. She was also the joint-leading wicket-taker in the 2021 Women's London Championship, with 7 wickets. She took two wickets in six matches in the 2022 Women's Twenty20 Cup.

In 2020, Belt played for South East Stars in the Rachael Heyhoe Flint Trophy. She appeared in two matches, taking 2 wickets at an average of 41.00. In 2021, she was in the Oval Invincibles squad in The Hundred, but did not play a match.

References

External links

1997 births
Living people
People from Margate
Kent women cricketers
South East Stars cricketers